Judy Clark (1921–2002) is an actress.

Judy or Judith Clark(e) may also refer to:

Judy Clarke (born 1952), American criminal defense attorney
Judy Clark (artist) (born 1949), British artist
Judith Alice Clark (born 1949), American activist and convicted felon
Judith Clarke (1943–2020), Australian author